Vardan Petrosyan (born February 27, 1959) is an Armenian actor, scriptwriter, and parodist. He is based in Paris and Yerevan and holds a dual Armenian and French citizenship. Petrosyan is widely considered one of the greatest contemporary Armenian actors, touching various issues such as the Armenian genocide, Armenian politics and foreign affairs in his performances.

Biography
Vardan Petrosyan was born on February 27, 1959, in Yerevan, Soviet Armenia. He graduated from the Terlemezian Art College in 1983. His father died in 1981, when he was 22 years old. After a two-year service in the Soviet Army, he returned to Yerevan in 1985 to establish—with Vahram Sahakian—the private theatre studio called Vozniner (Ոզնիներ, "Hedgehogs"). Between 1988 and 1992, when the Karabakh movement was in progress, Petrosyan wrote and staged several politically motivated performances. Until 1997, he played in short and feature films. Due to the harsh economic conditions in Armenia, Petrosyan moved to Paris in 1992. He appeared in several French plays.

Beginning in 2000, Vardan Petrosyan has been mainly performing one-man shows on various politics and social issues. Besides Armenia, he has also performed for the Armenian diaspora communities in the United States, France, Canada, Lebanon, Iran, Syria, Russia, etc.

2013 car accident
On October 20, 2013, Vardan Petrosyan got into a car accident on Yerevan-Yeghvard highway, where two sixteen-year-old boys died and four others were injured, including Petrosyan. After being treated in a Yerevan hospital, on November 9, Petrosyan was charged with "negligent breach of traffic rules, which causes death" and was taken into custody. The court rejected pleas to have him released on bail, despite a petition that eventually garnered 11,000 signatures. Petrosyan pleaded not guilty on January 26, 2015. He was sentenced to five years in prison on January 29, 2015, by a lower court in Kotayk Province. Petrosyan was released on September 2, 2015, and will serve the rest of his punishment outside prison. Early released in March 2017.

Performances and filmography

References

Armenian male film actors
1959 births
Living people
Male actors from Yerevan
Armenian emigrants to France
Armenian comedians
Soviet male actors
20th-century Armenian male actors